Shell Beach may refer to:


Places

United States
 Shell Beach, Pismo Beach, California, a neighborhood of Pismo Beach
 Shell Beach, La Jolla, California, a beach
 Shell Beach, Louisiana, an unincorporated community

Elsewhere
 Shell Beach (Western Australia), a beach
 Shell Beach, a camping site on Portland Island (British Columbia), Canada
 Shell Beach, Guyana, a beach

Other uses
 Shell Beach (band), a post-hardcore band from Hungary
 A fictional place in the 1998 movie Dark City